Trilokwa is a village located in East Champaran district in the state of Bihar, India. Trilokwa is considered as India's Biggest village. The village is located at about 100 km from the state capital, Patna. This Village is Located At 8 Km From Kesariya Stup, 5 km from Kesariya and 200 km from Valmiki Nagar National Park. Valmiki National Park, Tiger Reserve and Wildlife Sanctuary is located at the India-Nepal border in the West Champaran district of Bihar, India on the bank of river Gandak. It is the only National park in Bihar. The extensive forest area of Valmikinagar was previously owned by the Bettiah Raj and Ramanagar Raj until the early 1950s. Valmiki Tiger Reserve (VTR) is one of the natural virgin recesses in east India, situated in the north west corner of Bihar. The pristine forest and wilderness of VTR is an excellent example of Himalayan Terai landscape. VTR comprises the Valmiki National Park and Valmiki Wildlife Sanctuary. The VTR forest area covers 899.38 square kilometres (347.25 sq mi), which is 17.4% of the total geographical area of the district West Champaran. As of 2013, there were 22 tigers in the Reserve. The village follows the Panchayati raj system.

References

East Champaran district